Mitchell Wallis (born 24 October 1992) is an Australian rules footballer who last played for the Western Bulldogs in the Australian Football League (AFL). He is the son of former Bulldogs legend Stephen Wallis.

Originally from Melbourne, Victoria, and graduating from St Kevin's College, Toorak in 2010, Wallis was drafted to the Bulldogs from the Calder Cannons in the TAC Cup with the 22nd selection in the 2010 AFL Draft as a father-son selection, after Port Adelaide nominated their intention to draft him with first-round pick (pick 16) if available.

Wallis has served as the Western Bulldogs' vice-captain under Marcus Bontempelli from the 2021 AFL season onward.

Early football

He captained Vic Metro in the 2010 NAB AFL Under-18 Championships, where he averaged 28 disposals at 83 per cent efficiency in three matches before being injured. He also captained his school's (St Kevin's College) First XVIII team, and represented them at the APS vs AGS representative game.

In the 2010 TAC Cup Grand Final, he had 47 disposals and was awarded best on ground, in the Cannons 58 point defeat of Gippsland Power.

AFL career
He made his AFL debut for the Bulldogs in Round 5 of the 2011 AFL season against  at Patersons Stadium, as the substitute player, replacing Tom Williams at three-quarter time.
In round 4 of the 2012 AFL season Wallis was rewarded with a nomination for the 2012 AFL Rising Star.

The injury ended his season, and he subsequently missed out on the club's premiership win in October.

Statistics
 Statistics are correct to the end of round 6, 2022

|-
! scope="row" style="text-align:center" | 2011
|style="text-align:center;"|
| 3 || 6 || 0 || 2 || 34 || 38 || 72 || 17 || 25 || 0.0 || 0.3 || 5.7 || 6.3 || 12.0 || 2.8 || 4.2 || 0
|- style="background-color: #EAEAEA"
! scope="row" style="text-align:center" | 2012
|style="text-align:center;"|
| 3 || 19 || 7 || 3 || 167 || 257 || 424 || 68 || 79 || 0.4 || 0.2 || 8.8 || 13.5 || 22.3 || 3.6 || 4.2 || 0
|-
! scope="row" style="text-align:center" | 2013
|style="text-align:center;"|
| 3 || 18 || 6 || 1 || 140 || 192 || 332 || 28 || 89 || 0.3 || 0.1 || 7.8 || 10.7 || 18.4 || 1.6 || 4.9 || 0
|- style="background-color: #EAEAEA"
! scope="row" style="text-align:center" | 2014
|style="text-align:center;"|
| 3 || 13 || 2 || 2 || 77 || 137 || 214 || 19 || 57 || 0.2 || 0.2 || 5.9 || 10.5 || 16.5 || 1.5 || 4.4 || 0
|-
! scope="row" style="text-align:center" | 2015
|style="text-align:center;"|
| 3 || 20 || 15 || 13 || 205 || 263 || 468 || 66 || 95 || 0.8 || 0.7 || 10.3 || 13.2 || 23.4 || 3.3 || 4.8 || 8
|- style="background-color: #EAEAEA"
! scope="row" style="text-align:center" | 2016
|style="text-align:center;"|
| 3 || 17 || 11 || 6 || 155 || 233 || 388 || 45 || 57 || 0.7 || 0.4 || 9.1 || 13.7 || 22.8 || 2.7 || 3.4 || 5
|-
! scope="row" style="text-align:center" | 2017
|style="text-align:center;"|
| 3 || 12 || 7 || 5 || 86 || 162 || 248 || 37 || 43 || 0.6 || 0.4 || 7.2 || 13.5 || 20.7 || 3.1 || 3.6 || 0
|- style="background-color: #EAEAEA"
! scope="row" style="text-align:center" | 2018
|style="text-align:center;"|
| 3 || 18 || 20 || 3 || 143 || 242 || 385 || 59 || 71 || 1.1 || 0.2 || 7.9 || 13.4 || 21.4 || 3.3 || 3.9 || 0
|-
! scope="row" style="text-align:center" | 2019
|style="text-align:center;"|
| 3 || 10 || 8 || 5 || 99 || 119 || 218 || 36 || 27 || 0.8 || 0.5 || 9.9 || 11.9 || 21.8 || 3.6 || 2.7 || 2
|-style="background-color: #EAEAEA"
! scope="row" style="text-align:center" | 2020
|style="text-align:center;"|
| 3 || 18 || 25 || 14 || 83 || 83 || 166 || 42 || 32 || 1.4 || 0.8 || 4.6 || 4.6 || 9.2 || 2.3 || 1.8 || 2
|-
! scope="row" style="text-align:center" | 2021
|style="text-align:center;"|
| 3 || 6 || 4 || 2 || 28 || 33 || 61 || 20 || 10 || 0.7 || 0.3 || 4.7 || 5.5 || 10.2 || 3.3 || 1.7 || 0
|-style="background-color: #EAEAEA"
! scope="row" style="text-align:center" | 2022
|style="text-align:center;"|
| 3 || 3 || 2 || 3 || 12 || 8 || 20 || 6 || 5 || 0.7 || 1.0 || 4.0 || 2.7 || 6.7 || 2.0 || 1.7 || TBA
|-
|- class="sortbottom"
! colspan=3| Career
! 160
! 107
! 59
! 1229
! 1767
! 2996
! 443
! 590
! 0.7
! 0.4
! 7.7
! 11.0
! 18.7
! 2.8
! 3.7
! 17
|}

Notes

Honours and achievements
Junior
Best on Ground -TAC cup Grand Final : 2010
TAC Cup premiers - Calder Cannons : 2009, 2010

References

External links

1992 births
Living people
Australian rules footballers from Melbourne
Western Bulldogs players
People educated at St Kevin's College, Melbourne
Calder Cannons players
Williamstown Football Club players